The Men's 1 x 4 + 2 x 5 kilometre relay in cross-country skiing was held on 9 April 2011. The relay was open for skiers in classification category visual impairment, sitting, and standing.

Results

See also
FIS Nordic World Ski Championships 2011 – Men's 4 × 10 kilometre relay

References

2011 IPC Biathlon and Cross-Country Skiing World Championships Live results, and schedule at ipclive.siwidata.com
WCH - Khanty Mansiysk - Results - Cross-Country Relay, IPC Nordic Skiing

Relay